Alhaji Mamud Aliyu Shinkafi is a Nigerian politician. He was elected governor of Zamfara State in 2007 on the All Nigeria Peoples Party (ANPP) slate.

Later in 2008, Shinkafi defected to the rival Peoples Democratic Party (PDP), causing considerable controversy.

He is married to Saratu Mahmud Aliyu Shinkafi.

References

Living people
Zamfara State
All Nigeria Peoples Party politicians
Peoples Democratic Party state governors of Nigeria
Governors of Zamfara State
Year of birth missing (living people)